Africa One may refer to: 
 AfricaOne (Uganda), a regional airline based in Uganda
 Africa One (Congo Kinshasa), a regional airline based in the Democratic Republic of the Congo

See also
 2007 Africa One Antonov An-26 crash
 2002 Africa One Antonov An-26 crash